Rubery railway station was a railway station in the district of Rubery, Birmingham, England, on the Great Western Railway and Midland Railway's joint Halesowen Railway line from Old Hill to Longbridge. 
The station closed in 1919 for regular services but workmen's trains continued until 1958. The station was the location of the only passing loop between Halesowen and Longbridge. There were sidings for local traffic, of which there was not normally much

References

Further reading

Disused railway stations in Birmingham, West Midlands
Former Midland Railway stations
Former Great Western Railway stations
Railway stations in Great Britain opened in 1883
Railway stations in Great Britain closed in 1919